Albania debuted in the Junior Eurovision Song Contest in .  (RTSH), a member organisation of the European Broadcasting Union (EBU), has been responsible for the selection process of their participants since their debut.

The nation’s first representative was Igzidora Gjeta in 2012 with the song "" in, which achieved a score of thirty-five points, finishing in twelfth place out of twelve participating entries. Albania subsequently competed every year until , when they had their first absence from the contest in six years after withdrawing due to the COVID-19 pandemic.

History 

In 2005, Albanian broadcaster  (RTSH) broadcast that year’s contest in Hasselt. On 14 August 2012, RTSH announced that they would be making their Junior Eurovision debut at the 2012 contest in Amsterdam, Netherlands on 1 December 2012. The mechanism used at the time in order to select their representative was a national pre-selection show entitled . It consisted of a televised production in which the participants voted for each other, giving one, two, or three points to each other with no jury or public vote. Child-singer, Igzidora Gjeta, was the first participant to represent Albania with the song "", which finished in twelfth place achieving a score of thirty-five points. This was Albania's worst result in their contest history.

On 27 September 2013, RTSH announced that their withdrawal from the 2013 contest, with the EBU stating that the withdrawal was due to financial and organisational issues. Albania continued to be absent from the contest in 2014, and it was not until 13 March 2015 that RTSH announced their return to the competition. The national selection show which was organised in order to select the 2015 participant was entitled , and was won by Mishela Rapo with the song "". At the Junior Eurovision Song Contest 2015, Rapo finished in fifth place, achieving ninety-three points and their best result to date.

She received thirty-eight points, therefore finishing thirteenth out of seventeen participating countries.

Participation overview

Commentators and spokespersons 
The contests are broadcast online worldwide through the official Junior Eurovision Song Contest website junioreurovision.tv and YouTube. In 2015, the online broadcasts featured commentary in English by junioreurovision.tv editor Luke Fisher and 2011 Bulgarian Junior Eurovision Song Contest entrant Ivan Ivanov. The Albanian broadcaster, RTSH, sent their own commentator to each contest in order to provide commentary in the Albanian language. Spokespersons were also chosen by the national broadcaster in order to announce the awarding points from Albania. The table below list the details of each commentator and spokesperson since 2012.

See also 
 Albania in the Eurovision Song Contest
 Albania in the Eurovision Young Dancers
 Albania in the Eurovision Young Musicians

References 

 

 
Countries in the Junior Eurovision Song Contest